Tribute to John Coltrane "A Love Supreme" is a live album by jazz drummer Elvin Jones featuring two of John Coltrane's compositions performed by Jones' "Special Quartet" featuring Wynton Marsalis recorded in 1992 at the Pit Inn in Tokyo, Japan and released on the Columbia label.

Reception
The Allmusic review stated "An essential recording for Jones and Marsalis completists".

Track listing
All compositions by John Coltrane except as indicated 
 "A Love Supreme: Part 1: Acknowledgement/Part 2: Persuance/Part 3: Resolution" - 47:16
 "Dear Lord" - 6:32
 "Happy Birthday for "Yuka"" (Traditional) - 7:24  
 "Blues to Veen" (Wynton Marsalis) - 15:04

Personnel
Elvin Jones  - drums 
Wynton Marsalis - trumpet
Marcus Roberts - piano
Reginald Veal - bass

References

Elvin Jones live albums
1994 live albums
Columbia Records live albums
John Coltrane tribute albums